The Podolica is a breed of domestic cattle from southern Italy. It belongs to the Podolic group of grey cattle. It is raised in the regions of Abruzzo, Basilicata, Calabria, Campania, Molise and Puglia. It was formerly distributed throughout most of mainland Italy and as far as Istria, now part of Croatia, and where it is now regarded as a separate breed, the Istrian or Boškarin. The Podolica was in the past bred principally as a draught animal; with the mechanisation of agriculture following the Second World War demand for draught oxen disappeared, and the Podolica is now raised for meat and, to a lesser extent, for milk.

History

The origins of the Podolica breed are not known. As with other European grey cattle, it has been suggested that it derives from cattle of the Podolian (Ukrainian) steppes of eastern Europe, possibly brought to Italy by invading Goths in the fifth century AD or by the Lombard king Agilulf in the sixth century. This hypothesis is based on the zoological theories of the nineteenth century, going back to the Bos taurus podolicus of Johann Andreas Wagner. It is not supported by modern genetic, zoological or archaeological research. 

There were numerous regional and other types of Italian grey cattle: the Abruzzese, the Calabrese, the Montanara, the Murgese, the Pugliese, the Pugliese del Basso Veneto and others. The name "Podolico" for grey cattle came into use in Italy from the early twentieth century. The need for a herdbook was recognised in 1976; it was established in 1984, and a breed standard drawn up from observation of about 15,000 animals. In 1986 the standards of selection were modified to allow meat production to be favoured over other characteristics.

The total population was estimated in 2008 at 100,000 head, of which about 25,000 were recorded in the herdbook. At the end of 2013 the total number registered in the herdbook was 27,509, including 391 registered bulls; more than 80% of the registered stock was in Basilicata and Campania.

The breed is considered to be at risk from indiscriminate cross-breeding with bulls of specialised meat breeds.

Characteristics

The Podolica is a rustic breed capable of surviving on harsh terrain and poor pasture. It can exploit food sources that would not otherwise be used, including stubble, scrub and maquis, and woodland undergrowth. The animals are fed hay and straw only in winter.

The colour of the Podolica shows pronounced sexual dimorphism: cows are pale grey, tending to white, while males are darker and may be almost black. As in other breeds of grey cattle, the calves are born wheat-coloured but become grey at about three months. The skin is black, as are the natural openings. The horns are light, lyre-shaped in cows, half-moon-shaped in bulls; they are slate-grey in young animals, becoming pale at the base and dark at the tip with maturity. The breed is of medium size and lightweight; the skeleton is light.

Use

The Podolica was in the past mainly kept for draught work; meat and milk production were secondary to this. After the Second World War the progressive mechanisation of agriculture meant that demand for draught oxen disappeared. The breed is now raised mainly for meat; in some areas it is also kept for milk.

Calves are weaned no sooner than four months; they are normally sent to slaughter at 15–16 months, at which time they weigh  The meat is considered to be of high quality and carries a registered mark of quality.

The milk is used to make caciocavallo; the sought-after Caciocavallo Podolico del Gargano from the Gargano Peninsula in the province of Foggia is made only from it.

References 

Cattle breeds
Cattle breeds originating in Italy
Ark of Taste foods